"Pride (In the Name of Love)" is a song by Irish rock band U2. It is the second track on the band's 1984 album, The Unforgettable Fire, and was released as its lead single in September 1984. The song was produced by Brian Eno and Daniel Lanois. Written about the American civil rights leader Martin Luther King Jr., "Pride" received mixed critical reviews at the time, but it was a major commercial success for U2 and has since become one of their most popular songs. It appeared on the band's compilation albums The Best of 1980–1990 and U218 Singles and was reworked and re-recorded for Songs of Surrender (2023).

In 2004, Rolling Stone ranked it 378th on its list of "The 500 Greatest Songs of All Time". The song was included on The Rock and Roll Hall of Fame's 500 Songs that Shaped Rock and Roll list.

Writing and recording
The melody and the chords for "Pride" were improvised by U2 during a soundcheck prior to a November 1983 concert in Hawaii on the band's War Tour. Guitarist the Edge led the group with a series of chord changes during the soundcheck, but after someone made a mistake, the other members picked up on it and changed course, providing a "new twist" to the improvisation, according to Niall Stokes. After the tour concluded, the group continued to work on the track at lead vocalist Bono's home in a Martello tower in Bray, County Wicklow, where the Edge devised a guitar part for the song. "Pride" was further worked on at Slane Castle during the recording sessions for The Unforgettable Fire, and was ultimately completed at Windmill Lane Studios.

The song had been intended to be based on Ronald Reagan's pride in America's military power, but Stephen B. Oates's book Let The Trumpet Sound: A Life of Martin Luther King, Jr. and a biography of Malcolm X caused the lyricist Bono to ponder the different sides of the civil rights campaigns, the violent and the non-violent. In subsequent years, Bono has expressed his dissatisfaction with the lyrics, which he describes, along with another Unforgettable Fire song, "Bad", as being "left as simple sketches". He says that he was swayed by the Edge and producers Brian Eno and Daniel Lanois, who played down the need to develop the lyrics as they thought their impressionistic nature would give added forcefulness to the song's feeling, particularly when heard by non-English speakers. In U2 by U2, Bono said: "I looked at how glorious that song was and thought: 'What the fuck is that all about?' It's just a load of vowel sounds ganging up on a great man. It is emotionally very articulate - if you didn't speak English."

The song contains the erroneous reference to King's shooting as "Early morning, April 4," when it actually occurred after 6 p.m. Bono acknowledges the error and in live performances he often changes the lyric to "Early evening..."  The error is corrected, by being changed to "In the evening, April 4" on the acoustic version included on 2023's Songs of Surrender album.

Chrissie Hynde of the Pretenders sang backing vocals on the recording. She was married to Jim Kerr of Simple Minds at the time and she is credited as "Christine Kerr".

Composition
"Pride" is in the key of B, and is played at a tempo of 106 bpm. The song follows a chord progression of B-E–A–Fm and the solo is B–D–E–E.

Music videos
Three music videos were made. The first was shot in August by director Donald Cammell and features opening and closing shots of the Dublin Docklands area. Two versions of this video exist; black and white and colour (sepia). The band were not satisfied with Cammell's video, and they agreed to their principal photographer, Anton Corbijn, shooting an alternative. The second video was filmed in a basement near London's Heathrow Airport, it features U2 standing sternly in front of a wall under poor lighting conditions. The U2 camp was also unimpressed with this video and a third video is produced by compiling footage shot during The Unforgettable Fire recording sessions at Slane Castle. The original (black and white) Cammell video was primarily used in promotion.

Reception
"Pride" reached number 3 on the UK Singles Chart. The song was the band's first top 40 hit in the United States where it peaked at number 33. It gained considerable US album-oriented rock radio airplay and its video was on heavy rotation on MTV, thus helping U2 continue its commercial breakthrough begun with the War album. It reached number 1 in New Zealand, the first time a U2 single topped a country's singles chart.

Initial critical reactions to "Pride" were mixed, especially in regards to the lyrics. Robert Christgau in The Village Voice complained of "the moralism with the turn-somebody-else's-cheek glorification of Martin Luther King's martyrdom." Meanwhile, Kurt Loder of Rolling Stone wrote that Pride' gets over only on the strength of its resounding beat and big, droning bass line, not on the nobility of its lyrics, which are unremarkable."  Cash Box called it a "rousing anthem" with "powerful vocal and guitar," saying that "Bono’s writing and vocal delivery are pure inspiration as is the pounding rhythm section." The 1984 Pazz & Jop poll of 240 music critics ranked "Pride" as the 12th-best single of that year, a higher ranking than the overall album, which finished 29th. The single's ranking remained the highest of any U2 single until "One" achieved 8th in 1992.

Live performances

"Pride" was first played live at the opening show of the Unforgettable Fire Tour on 29 August 1984 in Christchurch, New Zealand. The song has been played at virtually every U2 concert since the Unforgettable Fire Tour, although it was played infrequently on the first and second legs of 2001's Elevation Tour and the second and third legs 2009's U2 360° Tour. Clips from Martin Luther King speeches are often shown on the various tour video screens during these performances. In 2010, in Brisbane, Australia, the final verse was changed to reflect the 30th anniversary of the assassination of John Lennon (8 December 2010).

U2 performed the song, along with "City of Blinding Lights", to upwards of 400,000 people on 18 January 2009 at the We Are One concert at the Lincoln Memorial to celebrate the upcoming inauguration of Barack Obama. At the end of the performance Bono asked the audience to sing for King's dream, saying it was "not just an American dream; also an Irish dream, a European dream, an African dream", before referencing it to the Israeli–Palestinian conflict and saying that it was "an Israeli dream, and also a Palestinian dream." The performance of "Pride" closed off with Bono quoting part of King's speech "I Have a Dream," saying "Let freedom ring! Let freedom ring! Let freedom ring! Every village, every hamlet, every state, every city. Let freedom ring!" before seguing into "City of Blinding Lights." Bassist Adam Clayton later said "We were scratching our heads going, 'How does an Irish band get invited to play at the Presidential Inauguration?' Our way in was through a song like 'Pride'. It allowed Obama's people to express the connection without being too overt. It was one of those moments where you know the world is watching, but a healthy amount of anxiety gets your mojo working."

Live performances of "Pride" appear on the concert films Rattle and Hum (both the album and motion picture), Zoo TV: Live from Sydney, PopMart: Live from Mexico City, U2 Go Home: Live from Slane Castle, Vertigo 2005: Live from Chicago, Live from Paris, and U2 3D.

Legacy
In 1989, Spin named the song the 65th-greatest single in history. In 2004, Rolling Stone placed the song at number 378 on its list of "The 500 Greatest Songs of All Time"; the song was re-ranked to 388th on the magazine's 2010 version of the list. The Rock and Roll Hall of Fame selected "Pride (In the Name of Love)" as one of 500 Songs that Shaped Rock and Roll. Music television network VH1 ranked the song number 38 on the "100 Greatest Songs of the 80s" countdown in its series The Greatest. In 2004, Mojo placed the song at number 63 on its list of the "100 Epic Rock Tracks".

In 2007, the Roots covered "Pride" in a medley with "Sunday Bloody Sunday" for an NAACP dinner honoring Bono. The band also mixed in some of their own "False Media" and bits of Edwin Starr's "War".

Formats and track listings

Personnel
U2
Bono – lead vocals
The Edge – guitar, backing vocals
Adam Clayton – bass guitar
Larry Mullen Jr. – drums

Additional performers
Chrissie Hynde (credited as "Christine Kerr") – backing vocals

Charts

Weekly charts

Year-end charts

Certifications

See also
List of covers of U2 songs - Pride (In the Name of Love)
Civil rights movement in popular culture

References
Footnotes

Bibliography

 
 
 
 

1984 singles
Songs about Martin Luther King Jr.
U2 songs
CBS Records singles
Island Records singles
Song recordings produced by Brian Eno
Songs written by Bono
Songs written by the Edge
Songs written by Adam Clayton
Songs written by Larry Mullen Jr.
Song recordings produced by Daniel Lanois
Music videos directed by Anton Corbijn
1984 songs
Number-one singles in New Zealand